New Waverly is an unincorporated community in Miami Township, Cass County, Indiana.

History
New Waverly was laid out in 1855. It was likely named after the Waverley Novels by Sir Walter Scott. The New Waverly post office was established in 1857.

Geography

References

Unincorporated communities in Cass County, Indiana
Unincorporated communities in Indiana
1855 establishments in Indiana